The women's heptathlon competition of the athletics events at the 2019 Pan American Games took place between the 7th and 8th of August at the 2019 Pan American Games Athletics Stadium. The defending Pan American Games champion is Yorgelis Rodríguez from Cuba.

Records
Prior to this competition, the existing world and Pan American Games records were as follows:

Schedule

Results
All times shown are in seconds.

100 m hurdles
Wind: +0.2 m/s

High jump

Shot put

200 m
Wind: +1.0 m/s

Long jump

Javelin throw

800 m

Final standings

References

Athletics at the 2019 Pan American Games
2019